Denmark participated at the Junior Eurovision Song Contest 2004, sending their second entry to the contest. The Danish entry was Cool Kids with the song "Pigen er min", which was the winner of the Danish national selection MGP 2004.

Before Junior Eurovision

MGP 2004 
DR held the 4th edition of the MGP contest on 25 September 2004 to select the Danish entry to the Junior Eurovision Song Contest. 

The final was held at the DR Studio 3 in Copenhagen, hosted by Christine Milton and Mads Lindemann. The winner was chosen through two rounds of televoting and SMS voting: firstly, the top 5 songs were selected from the 10 competing songs to progress to the superfinal, where the final winner was chosen through another round of televoting. The votes were distributed among a number of regions, who gave points to each song.

The winner was Cool Kids with his song "Pigen er min", receiving 58 points.

At Junior Eurovision
Cool Kids performed 14th in the running order of the contest, held in Lillehammer, Norway, following United Kingdom and preceding Spain. At the close of the voting Denmark received 116 points, placing 5th of the 18 competing entries.

Voting

References

Junior Eurovision Song Contest
Denmark
Junior Eurovision Song Contest
Junior